Liberal College, Imphal, established in 1979, is a general degree college in Imphal, Manipur. It offers undergraduate courses in science, arts and commerce. It is affiliated to  Manipur University.

Departments

Science
Physics
Chemistry
Mathematics
Geology
Statistics
Anthropology
Botany
Zoology
Home Science

Arts and Commerce
Manipuri
English
Hindi
History
Geography
Political Science
Philosophy
Economics
Education
Sociology
Commerce

Accreditation
The college is recognized by the University Grants Commission (UGC).

See also
Education in India
Manipur University
Literacy in India
List of institutions of higher education in Manipur

References

External links
https://liberalcollege.ac.in

Colleges affiliated to Manipur University
Educational institutions established in 1979
Universities and colleges in Manipur
1979 establishments in Manipur